Väätsa Nature Reserve is a nature reserve which is located in Järva County, Estonia.

The area of the nature reserve is 418 ha.

The protected area was founded in 2005 to protect valuable habitat types and threatened species in Saueaugu, Röa and Vissuvere village (all in Väätsa Parish).

References

Nature reserves in Estonia
Geography of Järva County